Daniel Norton was an English politician.

Daniel Norton may also refer to:

Daniel Norton (Australian politician) (1905–1992), Australian politician
Daniel Sheldon Norton (1829–1870), American politician
Daniel M. Norton (c. 1843-1918), African-American politician in Virginia
Dan Norton (born 1988), rugby player